Darren Lockyer is an Australian former rugby league footballer who represented the Australian national team in 65 matches between 1997 and 2011. His first four matches were played for an Australian team representing the Super League governing body, and are not recognised as Test matches by the Australian Rugby League, the succeeding governing body under which he played a further 59 Tests and 2 internationals.

Lockyer's appearances are numbered based on which matches have Test match status. Those with a blue background indicate that he was captain in that game.

References 

 
Lists of Australian rugby league players